Bernard Coulson (born 1965) is a Canadian actor known for his roles as "The Thinker" on The X-Files, as "Michael Reardon" on Intelligence, and as "Pipefitter", the drummer of a reuniting punk band, in the Canadian mockumentary Hard Core Logo.

Early life
Coulson was born and raised in Vancouver, British Columbia, where he graduated from Magee Secondary School in 1983. Coulson currently resides in the Vancouver Downtown Eastside where he suffers from a drug addiction, but is currently in rehab.

Career
Coulson shared an apartment with Brad Pitt in Los Angeles when they were both starting their career. Coulson played Sid in the 1979 TV series Huckleberry Finn and His Friends and as Sal in Loverboy. He played Kenneth Joyce, the star witness in the courtroom drama The Accused. He played "Rick Diesel" in Eddie and The Cruisers II, Eddie Lives. On television he has made guest appearances on MacGyver and Murder She Wrote, among others. He has most recently starred in the 2016 Canadian thriller film Dark Harvest as the character Frank Becker.

References

External links

1965 births
Canadian male film actors
Canadian male television actors
Date of birth missing (living people)
Living people
Male actors from Vancouver